The Edison Plaza is a 17-story office building in downtown Beaumont, Texas, located at 350 Pine St. The building is downtown's newest and tallest skyscraper.
Originally built by Gulf States Utilities as its headquarters in 1982, it serves as the Texas headquarters for its successor, Entergy, Texas; however, Entergy no longer owns the building and leases four floors only out of the 17 in the building. It is erroneously called "The Entergy Building" but its correct name is still Edison Plaza. On the grounds of the Edison Plaza is the Edison Museum. As of November 2015, Capital One acquired signage rights to the building.

References

Buildings and structures in Beaumont, Texas
Entergy
Office buildings completed in 1982
1982 establishments in Texas
Skyscrapers in Texas
Skyscraper office buildings in Texas